Stockport Grammar School is a co-educational private day school in Stockport, England. Founded in 1487 by former Lord Mayor of London Sir Edmund Shaa, it is the second oldest in the North of England, after Lancaster Royal Grammar School, and a member of the Headmasters' and Headmistresses' Conference.

History

Foundation

The school was founded in 1487 by Sir Edmund Shaa, the 1482 Lord Mayor of London whose will provided for a school and a small chapel in St Mary's Church in Stockport and funds to maintain a priest to chant masses and teach grammar. Alexander Lowe, the mayor of Stockport, left the school a permanent home in Chestergate in his will. 
The school became increasingly successful with pupils being accepted at the ancient universities of Oxford, Cambridge and St Andrews, while the curriculum became increasingly broad with the rudiments of Greek joining a study of Latin, the Christian religion, writing in English and arithmetic. Five years after the Worshipful Company of Goldsmiths met to discuss the possibility of transferring the school to a different site, new buildings open where Greek Street meets New Wellington Road. As well as paying for the building, the Goldsmiths also increased the salaries of the headmaster and usher and paid the running costs.

Current site on Buxton Road

The Greek Street building became unsuitable for the demands of a modern school, and the school was relocated in 1915 to its present site  and was inaugurated on 29 January 1916 by the chairman of the Cheshire county council.

Move to coeducation

In 1980, girls were admitted to the school. 

Following the government’s decision in 1974 to phase out the direct grant status of schools such as Stockport over a seven-year period commencing in 1976, the school would become independent and  the Stopfordian Trust was launched to provide bursaries that were increasingly being requested by entrance exam candidates.

The school site

The Mile End buildings 1916-1980

The construction of the present buildings took twenty months. The exterior of the West Front has remained virtually unchanged since the time. The Hallam Hall, seen from across the Old Quad below was named after the Mayor of Stockport and major benefactor Ephraim Hallam. This was originally the School’s Assembly Hall and later the main library but due to the expansion of the School site, which included a new, multi-resource 14000 book library, the hall was converted into an entertainments room. 

The main school building was constructed with a Victorian neo-gothic style of architecture, drawing similar appearances to that of Keble College, Oxford, which incidentally was built during the same time period. Other buildings which have been constructed since then have mostly remained continuous with the general style of the main site, particularly the muted red brick and distinctive yellow limestone bands which feature heavily on the main building.

Post-1980 Expansion

Since becoming co-educational in 1980 the school has developed and grown rapidly. Acquisition of the adjacent convent school site, which is now the English and music block, allowed the enclosure of the playing fields and the creation of several footballs and rugby pitches, as well as the inheritance of the convent's swimming pool. In 1997 land was bought to extend the junior school, and in 2001 a new sports and technology centre was built featuring a gymnasium and sports hall. Food technology and textiles technology classrooms were also erected. The building further includes a design technology workshop with equipment able to perform computer-aided design and computer-aided manufacture. 
The sports hall also holds an indoor climbing wall named after alumnus mountaineer Peter Boardman.
In September 2005 a new library and learning resource centre was opened with less than a dozen books, and also new physics labs and an information technology suite. A nursery was opened in 2006. With the purchase of the playing fields at Dialstone Lane, the school site expanded its site to almost 60 acres, one of the largest in Greater Manchester.

New Woodsmoor building 2013-

In 2011, planning permission was received to erect a new teaching block on the Woodsmoor side of the site, to replace the Woodsmoor hall and laboratories that were demolished in 2010. The build was completed in June 2012, and the "black and white tower" and classics block were demolished later that year.

Extracurricular Activities

The school offers over 200 extracurricular activities to its pupils, with the Independent Schools Inspectorate rating the school's extracurricular provision as "outstanding" in 2011.

Duke of Edinburgh's Award

The school is its own Duke of Edinburgh's Award operating authority. In 2010, the school issued its 1000th Duke of Edinburgh Award, a milestone which was marked by the visit of Prince Edward, Earl of Wessex.

Model United Nations
SGS's Model United Nations programme was founded by Tim Woffenden. In 1985 SGS was honoured to represent the USSR at the 40th anniversary MUN conference held at Central Hall, Westminster, to celebrate the first United Nations General Assembly, which was held there. In 1990 the SGS delegation, led by ambassador Robert Hartley, won the best delegation award at The Hague MUN, the world's largest. 
The school has hosted a biennial Model United Nations (MUN) conference since March 2006. At 2008's conference, Labour MP and former home secretary David Blunkett was the school's guest speaker. At 2012's conference, Senior Liberal Democrat MP, Andrew Stunell was the guest speaker.

Pupils have also attended MUN conferences in many locations, including Yale, Belfast, Edinburgh, Paris, Genoa, Bath and Cambridge.

Expeditions

The school runs a series of expeditions for Sixth Formers every two years to places such as Venezuela, Vietnam, Uganda, Namibia, Rwanda and in 2015 an expedition to Bolivia & Peru. In 2017, an expedition took 41 students to Borneo. Pupils participate in planning the trips and manage their own finances, accommodation, food and transportation.

House System

The school has four houses – Arden, Nicholson, Vernon, and Warren – into which all pupils are divided for the purposes of competitive sport and quizzes. Each year all four house compete for both the Fallow Shield (sporting success) and the Brown Cup (academic success). The houses encourage integration of all pupils into school life. Sport is not the only competitive activity for the houses, there is also chess and the competition of gaining the highest charitable amount.

Origin of the Houses
The four Houses were created initially in 1924 for competition in games and athletics with the undistinguished names of North, South, East and West. These were replaced in 1949 with rather more appropriate names of distinguished local families associated with the School in the past.

Arden

The Ardernes were an important county family deriving from Sir John de Arnerne who lived in the 18th century and who received a great estate within the Earldom of Chester. Subsequent marriages constantly added to the Arderne estate until they included a great part of Bredbury, Romiley, Werneth, Offerton, Stockport and Alvanley.
Ralph Arderne helped to defend Manchester against the Royalists in the Civil War. John Ardern (who changed the spelling of the family name), an Old Stopfordian, went to St. John’s College, Cambridge in 1728 and later became High Sheriff of Cheshire and his son Richard Pepper Arden was appointed as Lord Chief Justice of England with the title Lord Alvanley at the end of the 18th century. 
The Ardens had two local residences. Their town house was Underbank Hall, a fine half-timbered mansion (now the National Westminster Bank) and Harden Hall which once commanded a moated in Reddish.

Nicholson

The Nicholsons were a very numerous, though not a powerful family, who in the 16th century lived in the Reddish district. Their names occur frequently in the early Parish Registers which were first begun in 1584. Their main home was Wood Hall, Sandy Lane. The family originated in Cumberland (Cumbria) and, after a century or two at Reddish, the main branch moved on to become landowners in Essex, but left behind numerous relatives. William Nicholson, born probably in 1561 was a former Master of the School. He attend Caius College, Cambridge in June 1581, then changed to Jesus College, where he took his B.A. in 1585 and M.A. in 1588. No-one can say when he was appointed Master of Stockport Grammar School because the records of the Goldsmiths’ Company are missing from 1579 to 1592, but it is likely to be 1587, after the death of Francis Low. He died in office and was buried at Stockport in September 1597.
He was a man of substance, his will showing connections with other county families. He left money to pay for an “Usher” or assistant in the School as well as dictionaries and other books, which would of course be valuable in those days.

Vernon

The Vernon family belong to a wealthy, prolific and widespread English family with 11th-century origins in Vernon, France. William de Vernon arrived in England at the time of the Norman conquest and was granted lands in the County Palatine of Chester under the patronage of Hugh d'Avranches, 1st Earl of Chester. His son Richard was created a medieval Baron and settled at Shipbrook, near Northwich, Cheshire. Branches of the family flourished and its influence spread beyond Cheshire over the following centuries, partly as a result of judicious inter marriage. They were large benefactors of the School around the time of its founding, and out of the four houses, have the longest historic association with Stockport Grammar School.

Warren

The Warren Family were both rich and powerful being Lords of the Manor of Stockport from the time of Sir John de Warren in the 14th century until 1835 when they sold out their manorial rights to the Corporation.
The Warrens of Poynton were for centuries benefactors of the School. Sir Edward Warren, Baron of Stockport, gave additional increments to the Masters of the School over and above the salary paid by the Goldsmiths. He was High Sheriff of Cheshire in 1598. John and Edward Warren in 1705 arranged for a payment out of the manorial rates to be given to the Schoolmaster and Edward Warren, Lord of the Manor of Stockport in 1711 gave a considerable area of Great Moor to provide a permanent income for the Schoolmaster, the Mayor of the Town and the poor. 
Hugh Warren, 1669 - 1733, son of Judge Warren and brother of Edward, benefactor, attended the School under Headmaster Timothy Dobson M.A. as did doubtless other Warren of whom records now remain. The Warrens lived at Poynton Hall of which nothing now exists. Their town house was Millgate Hall, a fine Tudor mansion in Newbridge lane taken down in 1927. 
Warren house are the current holders of the Fallow Shield.

Publications

The Stopfordian

The school's annual publication is The Stopfordian, now a full-colour comprehensive review of the school year, which was first published in 1929. This makes The Stopfordian one of the longest-running school publications in the United Kingdom. A predecessor, named simply Stockport Grammar School Magazine, dates back to 1899.

Taking Stock

The school has published Taking Stock, a short glossy newsletter rounding up recent news and photographs, every term since 1996.

Old Stops' Review

Old Stops' Review, a new annual magazine containing news from ex-pupils, was first published in 2011.

Old Stopfordians
Former pupils are known as "Old Stopfordians", not to be confused with simply Stopfordians (the demonym of Stockport being "Stopfordian"), or the former pupils of Bishop Stopford's School at Enfield, who are also known as Old Stopfordians.

Pupils automatically become members of the Old Stopfordians Association on leaving the school. The association runs regular reunions and there is a strong network of Old Stopfordians who provide careers advice, work experience and support to current pupils. The association also run a number of social occasions during the year, including an annual dinner, and its members are encouraged to attend several of the school's regular events, including its founder's day and Christmas carol services.

Stopfordians Lacrosse Club
The Old Stopfordians' Association operate Stopfordians Lacrosse Club, who currently play in the North of England Men's Lacrosse Association Premier 2 division. The team play their home games at Disley Amalgamated Sports Club.

Notable Old Stopfordians

John Amaechi OBE (1970-), English retired NBA basketball player and broadcaster in the USA
David Armitage (1965-), Professor of History at Harvard University.
Thomas Ashe (1836–1889), English poet
Admiral Sir George Back FRS (1796 - 1878), British naval officer and Arctic explorer
Sir Victor Blank (1942-), British businessman and philanthropist
Peter Boardman (1950 - 1982), British Himalayan mountaineer and author, died on Everest
Martin Bourke (1947-), former British diplomat and Governor of the Turks and Caicos Islands
Geoff Downes (1952-), English rock keyboard player and songwriter for the bands Yes and Asia
Marianne Elliott (1966-), Tony Award-winning theatre director
Peter Firth (1953-),  former Suffragan Bishop of Malmesbury
Michael Gilbertson (1961-), current Archdeacon of Chester
Roger Hammond (1936-2012), English film, television and stage actor
 Nicholas Henshall (1944-2015) Historian
Mark Isherwood (1959-), Conservative member of the National Assembly for Wales for the region of North Wales
Chris Jones (1982-), English rugby union rugby player for The Worcester Warriors
Cecil Kimber (1888-1945), automobile engineer, founder of The MG car company
Sir Horace Lamb FRS (1849-1934), British applied mathematician and author of several influential texts on classical physics
Gordon Marsden (1953-), Labour Party politician who is the Member of Parliament (MP) for Blackpool South
Paul Morley (1957-), English music journalist who wrote for the New Musical Express from 1977 to 1983 and has since written for a wide range of publications
Samuel Perry (1877-1954), Labour Co-operative politician and father of the British tennis champion Fred Perry
Neil Andrew Megson (1950- 2020), English singer-songwriter, musician, poet, writer and performance artist Genesis P-Orridge.
Andy Stanford-Clark (1966-), leading British information technology research engineer for IBM and IBM Master Inventor
Di Stewart (1979-), television presenter on Sky Sports
William Tobin (1953-2022), astronomer and political candidate
Sir Frederic Calland Williams CBE (1911-1977), engineer and computer pioneer, who developed radar in World War II and the first stored-program digital computer

Headmasters

References

External links
 Stockport Grammar School
 Flickr: Stockport Grammar School's Photostream
 ISI Inspection Reports - Junior School &  Senior School

Ancient grammar schools of Cheshire
Educational institutions established in the 15th century
Private schools in the Metropolitan Borough of Stockport
1487 establishments in England
Member schools of the Headmasters' and Headmistresses' Conference
Schools in Stockport